The 2015 Northern Colorado Bears football team represented the University of Northern Colorado in the 2015 NCAA Division I FCS football season. They were led by fifth-year head coach Earnest Collins Jr. and played their home games at Nottingham Field. They were a member of the Big Sky Conference. They finished the season 6–5, 3–5 in Big Sky play to finish in a three way tie for eighth place.

Schedule

Source: Schedule
- Game will be televised on tape delay.

Game summaries

Western State (CO)

at Houston Baptist

at Southern Utah

Weber State

at Sacramento State

UC Davis

Eastern Washington

at Northern Arizona

Portland State

at North Dakota

Abilene Christian

References

Northern Colorado
Northern Colorado Bears football seasons
Northern Colorado Bears football